Dumitru Puntea (July 20, 1943 – December 5, 2009) was a Moldovan politician.

He served as member of the Parliament of Moldova.

External links 
 In memoriam Dumitru PUNTEA (Vicepreşedinte al primului Parlament)
 Declaraţia de Independenţă revizuită
 Cine au fost şi ce fac deputaţii primului Parlament din R. Moldova (1990-1994)?
 Declaraţia deputaţilor din primul Parlament
 Site-ul Parlamentului Republicii Moldova

References

1943 births
2009 deaths
Moldovan MPs 1990–1994
Popular Front of Moldova MPs
Deputy Presidents of the Moldovan Parliament